Matthew White (born 15 April 1987) is a former professional Australian rules footballer who played for the Richmond Football Club and Port Adelaide Football Club in the Australian Football League (AFL). He won the AFL Goal of the Year award while with Port Adelaide in 2014.

Junior football
White played his junior football with Sunbury, west of Melbourne, and the Calder Cannons in the TAC Cup.

AFL career

Richmond (2006–2013)
He made his AFL debut in round 10, 2006 against Fremantle. After showing plenty of promise in the backline in 2006, the youngster had a disappointing season in 2007, playing just seven games to take his career tally to 18. Eventually White's speed and ability to kick goals saw him become a regular wingman under coach Terry Wallace. In 2008 White played a career-high 20 games, averaging 13 disposals and kicking 11 goals for the season, and in 2009 White averaged 15 disposals in his 16 games. Wallace departed at the end of 2009 and Damien Hardwick became Richmond coach in 2010. White was generally used in a more defensive role. White playing only 12 more games in the 2011 season and just 7 games followed in 2012 through a combination of injury and lack of selection. White played 16 games in 2013 after round 5, often coming on as the substitute. His pace and aerobic capacity allowed him to be a burst player from the bench. Impressing in this role he has earned a regular position in the starting 22 late in the season and White appeared certain to play in Richmond's first final in 12 years before a hamstring injury in round 23 ruled him out of the final.

Port Adelaide (2014–2017)
At the end of the 2013 AFL season, White joined the Port Adelaide Football Club as a free agent. He was delisted by Port Adelaide at the conclusion of the 2017 season and subsequently retired from playing.

Statistics

|- style="background-color: #EAEAEA"
|- style="background:#eaeaea;"  
! scope="row" style="text-align:center" | 2006
|  || 35 || 11 || 2 || 2 || 69 || 52 || 121 || 42 || 30 || 0.2 || 0.2 || 6.3 || 4.7 || 11 || 3.8 || 2.7
|- 
! scope="row" style="text-align:center" | 2007
|  || 35 || 7 || 1 || 0 || 35 || 25 || 60 || 26 || 15 || 0.1 || 0 || 5 || 3.6 || 8.6 || 3.7 || 2.1
|- style="background:#eaeaea;" 
! scope="row" style="text-align:center" | 2008
|  || 35 || 20 || 11 || 7 || 163 || 104 || 267 || 85 || 64 || 0.6 || 0.4 || 8.2 || 5.2 || 13.4 || 4.3 || 3.2
|- 
! scope="row" style="text-align:center" | 2009
|  || 35 || 16 || 7 || 4 || 132 || 103 || 235 || 47 || 63 || 0.4 || 0.3 || 8.3 || 6.4 || 14.9 || 2.9 || 3.9
|- style="background:#eaeaea;" 
! scope="row" style="text-align:center" | 2010
|  || 35 || 16 || 11 || 9 || 132 || 51 || 183 || 54 || 57 || 0.7 || 0.6 || 8.3 || 3.2 || 11.5 || 3.4 || 3.7
|- 
! scope="row" style="text-align:center" | 2011
|  || 35 || 12 || 7 || 3 || 97 || 48 || 145 || 38 || 49 || 0.6 || 0.3 || 8.1 || 4 || 12.1 || 3.2 || 4.1
|- style="background:#eaeaea;" 
! scope="row" style="text-align:center" | 2012
|  || 35 || 7 || 4 || 2 || 38 || 37 || 75 || 16 || 11 || 0.6 || 0.3 || 5.4 || 5.3 || 10.7 || 2.3 || 1.6
|-
! scope="row" style="text-align:center" | 2013
|  || 35 || 16 || 11 || 6 || 140 || 61 || 201 || 53 || 49 || 0.7 || 0.4 || 8.8 || 3.8 || 12.6 || 3.3 || 3.1
|- style="background:#eaeaea;" 
! scope="row" style="text-align:center" | 2014
|  || 19 || 22 || 25 || 16 || 211 || 95 || 306 || 93 || 74 || 1.1 || 0.7 || 9.6 || 4.3 || 13.9 || 4.2 || 3.4
|-
! scope="row" style="text-align:center" | 2015
|   || 19 || 18 || 17 || 6 || 157 || 74 || 231 || 76 || 51 || 0.9 || 0.3 || 8.7 || 4.1 || 12.8 || 4.2 || 1.4
|- style="background:#eaeaea;" 
! scope="row" style="text-align:center" | 2016
|  || 19 || 1 || 0 || 0 || 2 || 0 || 2 || 0 || 2 || 0.0 || 0.0 || 2.0 || 0.0 || 2.0 || 0.0 || 2.0
|-
! scope="row" style="text-align:center" | 2017
|   || 19 || 7 || 2 || 4 || 60 || 33 || 93 || 22 || 20 || 0.3 || 0.6 || 8.6 || 4.7 || 13.3 || 3.1 || 0.3
|-
! colspan=3| Career
! 152
! 98
! 59
! 1236
! 683
! 1919
! 552
! 485
! 0.6
! 0.4
! 8.1
! 4.5
! 12.5
! 3.6
! 3.2
|}

References

External links

Matthew White's statistics from Footy Wire

Richmond Football Club players
Living people
1987 births
Australian rules footballers from Victoria (Australia)
Calder Cannons players
Port Adelaide Football Club players
Port Adelaide Football Club players (all competitions)
Coburg Football Club players